, also known as Hahha, was a city in ancient Mesopotamia located near the Balikh river. Hahnum was located near a trade route.

History 
 was a center of textile and wool in Anatolia. As well as gold for Sumeria.

Relationship with the Assyrians 
During a period of unrest in the city sometime before 1835 BCE, caused by a rebellion against Assyria, the merchants postponed all commercial activities. The treaty laid out terms on the textile, lapis lazuli, iron, and silver trade. The treaty also provides protections for lost goods. If goods were lost, the state would be obligated to search for it. If the goods could not be found, the owner would be compensated. It also mentions that if an Assyrian's blood was spilt in  then  would send the aggressor to Assyria where he would be executed. Other laws regarding Assyrians were mentioned in the text. It states that citizens could not covet an Assyrian's wealth and the state could not forcibly confiscate their wealth. Also, indebted Assyrians that left the city could not have their debt be repaid by any other persons and Assyrians could not be punished with hard labour. The treaty invoked the Assyrian deities as part of the oath.

Relationship with the Hittites 
The city was conquered by Hittites during the reign of King Hattusili I. Hattiusili worked with the city of Tikuani to conquer  during his Second Syrian Campaign. Despite this, Hattusili was also the one who freed the city.

References 

Ancient Mesopotamia
Former populated places in Syria